The 1891 All-Ireland Senior Hurling Championship Final was the 4th All-Ireland Final and the culmination of the 1891 All-Ireland Senior Hurling Championship, an inter-county hurling tournament for the top teams in Ireland. The match was held at Clonturk Park, Dublin, on 28 February 1892, between Kerry and Wexford. The Leinster champions lost out to their Munster counterparts on a score line of 2-3 to 1-5.

The game is notable for a number of reasons.  This remains Kerry's only triumph in the All-Ireland championship.  It came a full twelve years before their first All-Ireland title in Gaelic football.  This remains the only All-Ireland final to be decided after a period of extra-time.

Match details

1
All-Ireland Senior Hurling Championship Finals
February 1892 events
Kerry county hurling team matches
Wexford county hurling team matches